The year 1940 in film involved some significant events, including the premieres of the Walt Disney films Pinocchio and Fantasia.

Top-grossing films (U.S.)
The top ten 1940 released films by box office gross in North America are as follows:

Events
 February 10 – Tom and Jerry make their debut in the animated cartoon Puss Gets the Boot.
February 23 – Walt Disney's second animated feature film Pinocchio is released. Although not a box office success upon its initial release, the film receives critical acclaim and wins two Academy Awards, including one for Best Original Song for "When You Wish Upon a Star". Over the years, Pinocchio has gained a cult following and is now considered one of the greatest films of all time.
 April 12 – Alfred Hitchcock's first American film Rebecca is released, under the production of David O. Selznick. It would go on to win the Academy Award for Best Picture the following year.
 May 17 – My Favorite Wife is released.
 May – A reproduction of "America's First Movie Studio", Thomas Edison's Black Maria, is constructed.
 July 27 – Bugs Bunny makes his official debut in the animated cartoon A Wild Hare.
 October 15 – Charlie Chaplin's The Great Dictator, a satirical comedy starring him, premieres in New York City. It is a critical and commercial success and goes on to become Chaplin's most financially successful film.
 November 13 – World premiere of Walt Disney's animated film Fantasia at the Broadway Theatre in New York City, the first film to be released in a multi-channel sound format (see Fantasound). The film also marks the first use of the click track while recording the soundtrack, overdubbing of orchestral parts, simultaneous multitrack recording and is cited as a key chapter in the conception and development of the multi-channel surround system. Like Pinocchio, the film is a box office failure for Disney, though it recoups its cost years later and becomes one of the most highly regarded of Disney's films.
 December 5 – Release of The Thief of Bagdad, pioneering the use of chroma key effects.
 In the United Kingdom, the Crown Film Unit supersedes the GPO Film Unit in the production of documentary films.

Academy Awards

Best Picture: Rebecca – David O. Selznick, United Artists
Best Director: John Ford – The Grapes of Wrath
Best Actor: James Stewart – The Philadelphia Story
Best Actress: Ginger Rogers – Kitty Foyle
Best Supporting Actor: Walter Brennan – The Westerner
Best Supporting Actress: Jane Darwell – The Grapes of Wrath

1940 film releases
United States unless stated

January–March
January 1940
26 January
The Fighting 69th
February 1940
23 February
Pinocchio

April–June
April 1940
12 April
Rebecca
20 April
'Til We Meet Again

July–September
August 1940
30 August
Boom Town
September 1940
20 September
The Mummy's Hand

October–December
October 1940
15 October
The Great Dictator
November 1940
13 November
Fantasia
December 1940
5 December
The Philadelphia Story
20 December
Santa Fe Trail
27 December
Kitty Foyle

Notable films released in 1940
United States unless stated

A
Abe Lincoln in Illinois,  starring Raymond Massey
All This and Heaven Too, starring Bette Davis and Charles Boyer
Andy Hardy Meets Debutante, starring Lewis Stone, Mickey Rooney, Cecilia Parker, and Fay Holden
Angels Over Broadway, starring Douglas Fairbanks, Jr. and Rita Hayworth
Anne of Windy Poplars, starring Anne Shirley
The Ape, starring Boris Karloff
Arise, My Love, starring Claudette Colbert and Ray Milland
Arizona, starring Jean Arthur and William Holden

B
Band Waggon, directed by Marcel Varnel, starring Arthur Askey – (GB)
The Bank Dick, written by and starring W. C. Fields
 Beating Heart, starring Danielle Darrieux and Claude Dauphin – (France)
Before I Hang, starring Boris Karloff
The Biscuit Eater, directed by Stuart Heisler
Bismarck, starring Paul Hartmann – (Germany)
Black Friday, starring Boris Karloff and Béla Lugosi
The Blue Bird, starring Shirley Temple
Boom Town, starring Clark Gable, Claudette Colbert, Spencer Tracy, Hedy Lamarr
The Boys from Syracuse, starring Allan Jones 
Boys of the City, starring the East Side Kids
Brigham Young, starring Tyrone Power and Linda Darnell
British Intelligence, starring Boris Karloff
Broadway Melody of 1940, starring Fred Astaire and Eleanor Powell – final film of series
Brother Orchid, starring Edward G. Robinson, Ann Sothern, Humphrey Bogart

C
Calling Philo Vance, starring James Stephenson
Castle on the Hudson, directed by Anatole Litvak, starring John Garfield and Ann Sheridan
The Catacombs (Katakomby), directed by Martin Frič – (Czechoslovakia)
Charlie Chan at the Wax Museum, starring Sidney Toler
Charlie Chan in Panama, starring Sidney Toler
Christmas in July, directed by Preston Sturges
A Chump at Oxford, starring Stan Laurel and Oliver Hardy, featuring a young Peter Cushing
City for Conquest, starring James Cagney
Confucius – (China)
Contraband, directed by Michael Powell, starring Conrad Veidt and Valerie Hobson – (GB)
Convicted Woman, starring Rochelle Hudson and June Lang
Convoy – directed by Pen Tennyson, starring Clive Brook, John Clements (UK)
Crimes at the Dark House, directed by George King, starring Tod Slaughter – (GB)

D
Dance, Girl, Dance, starring Maureen O'Hara, Louis Hayward, Lucille Ball
Dark Command, starring John Wayne
Dead Man's Shoes, directed by Thomas Bentley, starring Leslie Banks – (GB)
The Devil Bat, starring Béla Lugosi
A Dispatch from Reuter's, starring Edward G. Robinson
Dívka v modrém – (Czechoslovakia)
Doomed to Die, starring Boris Karloff
Down Argentine Way, starring Don Ameche, Betty Grable and Carmen Miranda
Dr. Cyclops, directed by Ernest B. Schoedsack, starring Albert Dekker
Dr. Ehrlich's Magic Bullet, starring Edward G. Robinson, Ruth Gordon, Otto Kruger, Donald Crisp

E
East Side Kids, starring Leon Ames and the East Side Kids
Edison, the Man, starring Spencer Tracy
Ergens in Nederland (Somewhere in the Netherlands) – (Netherlands)
Escape, starring Norma Shearer and Robert Taylor

F
Fantasia, directed by Samuel Armstrong, James Algar, Bill Roberts, Paul Satterfield, Ben Sharpsteen, David D. Hand,  Hamilton Luske, Jim Handley, Ford Beebe, T. Hee, Norman Ferguson and Wilfred Jackson
The Fatal Hour, starring Boris Karloff
Flowing Gold, starring John Garfield and Frances Farmer
Foreign Correspondent, directed by Alfred Hitchcock, starring Joel McCrea
Four Sons, directed by Archie Mayo, starring Don Ameche
The Fox of Glenarvon, directed by Max W. Kimmich – (Germany)
French Without Tears, starring Ray Milland – (GB)

G
Gaslight, starring Anton Walbrook – (GB)
The Ghost Breakers, starring Bob Hope and Paulette Goddard
Girl in the News, starring Margaret Lockwood – (GB)
Give Us Wings, starring the Dead End Kids
Go West, starring the Marx Brothers
The Grapes of Wrath, directed by John Ford, starring Henry Fonda
The Great Dictator, directed by and starring Charlie Chaplin with Paulette Goddard and Jack Oakie
The Great McGinty, starring Brian Donlevy
Green Hell, starring Douglas Fairbanks, Jr. and Joan Bennett

H
Here Is the Point (Ahí está el detalle), starring Cantinflas – (Mexico)
His Girl Friday, directed by Howard Hawks, starring Cary Grant, Rosalind Russell, Ralph Bellamy
Hoots Mon!, directed by Roy William Neill, starring Max Miller and Florence Desmond (Britain)
The House Across the Bay, starring George Raft
The House of the Seven Gables, starring George Sanders 
The Howards of Virginia, starring Cary Grant and Martha Scott
Hullabaloo, starring Frank Morgan

I
I Love You Again, starring William Powell and Myrna Loy
I Take This Woman, starring Spencer Tracy and Hedy Lamarr
The Invisible Man Returns, starring Cedric Hardwicke and Vincent Price
The Invisible Woman, starring Virginia Bruce and John Barrymore
It All Came True, starring Ann Sheridan, Jeffrey Lynn, Humphrey Bogart

J
June Nights (Juninatten), starring Ingrid Bergman – (Sweden)

K
King of the White Elephant (Prajao Changpeuk) – (Thailand)
Kitty Foyle, starring Ginger Rogers

L
Laddie, starring Tim Holt 
Lady with Red Hair, starring Miriam Hopkins
The Letter, directed by William Wyler, starring Bette Davis
Lillian Russell, starring Alice Faye and Henry Fonda
Little Men, starring George Bancroft and Kay Francis
The Long Voyage Home, starring John Wayne

M
Maddalena, Zero for Conduct, directed by and starring Vittorio De Sica – (Italy)
The Man from Dakota, starring Wallace Beery
The Man Who Talked Too Much, starring George Brent
The Marines Fly High, starring Lucille Ball and Richard Dix
The Mark of Zorro, starring Tyrone Power and Linda Darnell
The Middle Watch, directed by Thomas Bentley, starring Jack Buchanan and Greta Gynt (Britain)
The Minister's Girlfriends (Přítelkyně pana ministra) – (Czechoslovakia)
Millionaires in Prison, starring Lee Tracy 
The Mortal Storm, starring Margaret Sullavan and James Stewart
The Mummy's Hand, starring Dick Foran
My Favorite Wife, starring Irene Dunne and Cary Grant
My Little Chickadee, starring Mae West and W. C. Fields

N
New Moon, starring Jeanette MacDonald and Nelson Eddy
Night Train to Munich, directed by Carol Reed, starring Margaret Lockwood and Rex Harrison – (GB)
North West Mounted Police, starring Gary Cooper, Paulette Goddard, Madeleine Carroll
Northwest Passage, starring Spencer Tracy and Robert Young

O
One Million B.C. (aka The Cave Dwellers), starring Carole Landis
One Night in the Tropics, film debut of Abbott and Costello
Our Town, starring William Holden and Martha Scott

P
Pastor Hall, directed by Roy Boulting – (GB)
The Philadelphia Story, directed by George Cukor, starring Katharine Hepburn, Cary Grant, James Stewart
Pinocchio, directed by Ben Sharpsteen and Hamilton Luske, starring Dickie Jones
Pride and Prejudice, starring Greer Garson and Laurence Olivier
Primrose Path, starring Ginger Rogers and Joel McCrea
The Proud Valley, starring Paul Robeson – (GB)

Q
Queen of the Yukon, starring Charles Bickford

R
Rebecca, directed by Alfred Hitchcock, starring Joan Fontaine and Laurence Olivier – Oscar for best picture
Remember the Night, starring Barbara Stanwyck and Fred MacMurray
Rhythm on the River, starring Bing Crosby and Mary Martin
Road to Singapore, starring Bing Crosby, Dorothy Lamour and Bob Hope – first in the series

S
Saps at Sea, starring Laurel and Hardy
The Sea Hawk, starring Errol Flynn
Seven Sinners, starring Marlene Dietrich and John Wayne
The Shop Around the Corner, directed by Ernst Lubitsch, starring Margaret Sullavan and James Stewart
The Siege of the Alcazar (L'Assedio dell'Alcazar) – (Italy)
Sky Murder, starring Walter Pidgeon
Son of Ingagi, directed by Richard Kahn
The Son of Monte Cristo, starring Louis Hayward and Joan Bennett
Spring Parade, starring Deanna Durbin
 The Stars Look Down, directed by Carol Reed, starring Michael Redgrave and Margaret Lockwood – (GB)
The Stationmaster (Der postmeister) – (Germany)
Strange Cargo, starring Clark Gable and Joan Crawford
Stranger on the Third Floor, starring Peter Lorre
Strike Up the Band, directed by Busby Berkeley, starring Judy Garland and Mickey Rooney
South of Suez, starring George Brent
Swiss Family Robinson, starring Thomas Mitchell and Edna Best

T
They Drive by Night, starring George Raft, Humphrey Bogart, Ida Lupino
They Knew What They Wanted, directed by Garson Kanin, starring Charles Laughton and Carole Lombard 
The Thief of Bagdad, starring Conrad Veidt and Sabu – (GB)
'Til We Meet Again, starring Merle Oberon and George Brent
Tom Brown's School Days, starring Cedric Hardwicke
Too Many Girls, starring Lucille Ball
Too Many Husbands, starring Jean Arthur, Fred MacMurray, Melvyn Douglas
Tørres Snørtevold – (Norway)
Torrid Zone, starring James Cagney, Ann Sheridan, Pat O'Brien
Turnabout, starring John Hubbard and Carole Landis

V
Vigil in the Night, starring Carole Lombard
Virginia City, starring Errol Flynn and Miriam Hopkins

W
Waterloo Bridge, starring Vivien Leigh and Robert Taylor
The Well-Digger's Daughter (La Fille du puisatier), directed by Marcel Pagnol, starring Raimu and Fernandel – (France)
The Westerner, starring Gary Cooper, Walter Brennan, Dana Andrews, Forrest Tucker
Where's That Fire?, starring Will Hay – (GB)
Wild Horse Range, starring Jack Randall
Women in War, starring Elsie Janis and Patric Knowles

Y
Young People, starring Shirley Temple
Young Tom Edison, starring Mickey Rooney
You're Not So Tough, starring the Dead End Kids

Serials
Adventures of Red Ryder, directed by William Witney and John English
Deadwood Dick, directed by James W. Horne
Drums of Fu Manchu, starring Henry Brandon and Robert Kellard, directed by William Witney and John English
Flash Gordon Conquers the Universe, starring Buster Crabbe
The Green Archer, starring Victor Jory, directed by James W. Horne
The Green Hornet, starring Warren Hull
Junior G-Men, starring the Dead End Kids
King of the Royal Mounted starring Allan Lane, directed by William Witney and John English
Mysterious Doctor Satan, starring Eduardo Ciannelli, directed by William Witney and John English
The Shadow, starring Victor Jory, directed by James W. Horne
Terry and the Pirates, starring William Tracy, directed by James W. Horne
Winners of the West, starring Dick Foran and Anne Nagel

Short film series
Buster Keaton (1917–1941)
Laurel and Hardy (1921–1943)
Our Gang (1922–1944)
Charley Chase (1924-1940)
The Three Stooges (1934–1959)

Animated short film series
Krazy Kat (1925-1940)
Mickey Mouse (1928–1953)
Looney Tunes (1930–1969)
Terrytoons (1930–1964)
Merrie Melodies (1931–1969)
Scrappy (1931–1941)
Popeye (1933–1957)
Color Rhapsodies (1934–1949)
Donald Duck (1937–1956)
Pluto (1937–1951)
Walter Lantz Cartunes (also known as New Universal Cartoons or Cartune Comedies) (1938–1942)
Goofy (1939–1955)
Andy Panda (1939–1949)
 Knock Knock! (first appearance of Woody Woodpecker)
Tom and Jerry (1940–1958)
 Puss Gets the Boot

Births
January 3 – Thelma Schoonmaker, American editor
January 10 - Walter Hill, American director, screenwriter and producer
January 20 - Krishnam Raju, Indian actor (died 2022)
January 22 – John Hurt, English actor (died 2017)
January 25 - Paolo Graziosi, Italian actor (died 2022)
January 27
James Cromwell, American actor
Reynaldo Rey, American actor, comedian and television personality (died 2015)
January 29 – Katharine Ross, American actress
February 4 – George A. Romero, American director, producer and screenwriter (died 2017)
February 5 - Dick Warlock, American actor and stuntman
February 12 – Ralph Bates, English actor (died 1991)
February 17 – Jo Kendall, British actress (died 2022)
February 19 - Carlin Glynn, American singer and retired actress
February 23 – Peter Fonda, American actor (died 2019)
February 27
Howard Hesseman, American actor (died 2022)
Bill Hunter, Australian actor (died 2011)
February 29 - Harvey Jason, English actor
March 7 - Daniel J. Travanti, American actor
March 9 – Raul Julia, Puerto Rican actor (died 1994)
March 10 – Chuck Norris, American actor and martial artist
March 26 – James Caan, American actor (died 2022)
March 27 - Austin Pendleton, American actor, playwright, theatre director and instructor
April 1 - Aliza Gur, Israeli actress
April 3 - Wolf Kahler, German actor
April 6 - Pedro Armendáriz Jr., Mexican actor (died 2011)
April 14 - Julie Christie, British actress
April 15 - Julie Sommars, American actress
April 17 – Billy Fury, English singer and actor (died 1983)
April 21 - George DiCenzo, American character actor (died 2010)
April 24 - Michael Parks, American actor and singer (died 2017)
April 25 – Al Pacino, American actor
April 29 - Max Cullen, Australian actor
April 30 – Burt Young, American actor
May 2 - Jo Ann Pflug, American actress
May 5 – Lance Henriksen, American actor
May 8 - Emilio Delgado, Mexican-American actor, voice artist and singer (died 2022)
May 15 – Lainie Kazan, American actress and singer
May 17 – Valie Export, Austrian director
May 28 - Josie Lloyd, American actress and director (died 2020)
June 1 – René Auberjonois, American actor (died 2019)
June 7 - Tom Jones (singer), Welsh singer and actor
June 8 - Nancy Sinatra, American singer and actress
June 20 – John Mahoney, English-born American actor (died 2018)
June 21 - Mariette Hartley, American actress
June 22 – Abbas Kiarostami, Iranian director (died 2016)
June 23 – Adam Faith, English actor and singer (died 2003)
June 26 - Luis Valdez, American playwright, screenwriter, director and actor
July 4 – Karolyn Grimes, American actress
July 7 – Ringo Starr, English drummer (The Beatles)
July 13 – Patrick Stewart, English actor
July 18 – James Brolin, American actor
July 22 – Alex Trebek, Canadian-American game show host and television personality (died 2020)
July 24 – Dan Hedaya, American actor
July 28 - Phil Proctor, American actor, voice actor and member of the Firesign Theatre
July 30 - Nicolau Breyner, Portuguese actor (died 2016)
August 3 – Martin Sheen, American actor
August 15 
 Maria Grazia Buccella, Italian actress
 Ze'ev Revach, Israeli comedian, film actor, director
August 19 – Jill St. John, American actress
August 23 - Tony Bill, American actor, producer and director
August 25 - Wilhelm von Homburg, German boxer, actor and professional wrestler (died 2004)
August 27 – Sonny Sharrock, American jazz guitarist (died 1994)
August 31
  Larry Hankin, American character actor, performer, director, comedian and producer.
  Jack Thompson, Australian actor
September 3 - Pauline Collins, British actress
September 5 – Raquel Welch, American actress (died 2023)
September 7 - Dario Argento, Italian director, producer and screenwriter
September 11 – Brian De Palma, American director, producer and screenwriter
September 12 - Linda Gray, American actress, director and producer
September 18 - Frankie Avalon, American actor and singer
September 19
Caroline John, English actress (died 2012)
Paul Williams (songwriter), American actor and singer
September 21 - Bill Kurtis, American producer and narrator
September 22 – Anna Karina, Danish-born French actress, director and singer (died 2019)
September 25 – Roberto Del Giudice, Italian voice actor (died 2007)
October 9 – John Lennon, English singer-songwriter and musician (The Beatles) (shot to death 1980)
October 14 – Cliff Richard, English singer and actor
October 16 - Barry Corbin, American actor
October 19 – Michael Gambon, Irish-born British actor
October 26 - Tilo Prückner, German actor (died 2020)
October 28 - Nic de Jager, South African actor
November 2 – Gigi Proietti, Italian actor (died 2020)
November 4 - Manuel Ojeda, Mexican actor (died 2022)
November 5 – Elke Sommer, German actress
November 13 – Rudolf Schwarzkogler, Austrian experimental filmmaker (died 1969)
November 14 - Bill Bolender, American character actor
November 15 – Sam Waterston, American actor
November 20 – Helma Sanders-Brahms, German director (died 2014)
November 22 - Terry Gilliam, American-born British screenwriter, director and animator (Monty Python's Flying Circus)
November 27 – Bruce Lee, Chinese-American martial artist and actor (died 1973)
December 1 – Richard Pryor, American comedian and actor (died 2005)
December 11 - Donna Mills, American actress
December 13
Volli Käro, Estonian actor
Carol Locatell, American actress
December 24
Janet Carroll, American character actress (died 2012)
Sharon Farrell, American actress
December 28 - Don Francisco (television host), Chilean television host
December 31 - Tim Considine, American actor and writer (died 2022)

Deaths
 January 4 – Flora Finch, 72, American actress, A Cure for Pokeritis, The Cat and the Canary, Quality Street, Her Crowning Glory
 January 22 – E. Alyn Warren, 65, American actor, The Mysterious Mr. Wong, Get That Man, Revolt of the Zombies, Port of Seven Seas
 February 20 – George Periolat, 66, American actor, The Mark of Zorro, One Rainy Afternoon, Morning Glory, What Price Hollywood?
 March 5 – Maxine Elliott, 66, American actress, Fighting Odds
 April 9 – Mrs. Patrick Campbell, 75, English actress, Riptide, One More River
 April 11 – Hemmo Kallio, 77, Finnish actor, Anna Liisa 
 May 25 – Joe De Grasse, 67, Canadian-born American film director, Heart o' the Hills, The Scarlet Car, The Girl of the Night
 July 1 – Ben Turpin, 70, American actor, Saps at Sea, Mr. Flip, A Clever Dummy
 July 15 – Donald Calthrop, 52, English actor, Scrooge, Blackmail, Murder!, Major Barbara
 September 25 – Marguerite Clark, 57, American actress, Scrambled Wives, Easy to Get, All of a Sudden Peggy, A Girl Named Mary
 October 10 – Berton Churchill, 63, Canadian actor, Stagecoach, I Am a Fugitive from a Chain Gang, In Old Chicago, Heroes for Sale
 October 12 – Tom Mix, 60, American actor, The Miracle Rider, Riders of the Purple Sage, Sky High
 December 13 – Wilfred Lucas, 69, Canadian-born American actor, screenwriter, director, Modern Times, A Chump at Oxford, The Girl and Her Trust

Debuts
Jack Albertson – Strike up the Band
Dana Andrews – Lucky Cisco Kid
Anne Baxter – 20 Mule Team
Hugh Griffith – Night Train to Munich
Van Johnson – Too Many Girls
Arthur Kennedy – City for Conquest
Karl Malden – They Knew What They Wanted
Terry Moore – Maryland
Robert Ryan – The Ghost Breakers
Gene Tierney – The Return of Frank James
David Tomlinson – Garrison Follies
Forrest Tucker – The Westerner
Gig Young – Misbehaving Husbands
Deborah Kerr – Contraband
Donna Reed – Convicted Woman

References

 
Film by year